Ngozi Province is one of the 18 provinces of Burundi.

The name Ngozi stands for blessing.

Communes
It is divided administratively into the following communes:

 Commune of Busiga
 Commune of Gashikanwa
 Commune of Kiremba
 Commune of Marangara
 Commune of Mwumba
 Commune of Ngozi
 Commune of Nyamurenza
 Commune of Ruhororo
 Commune of Tangara

 
Provinces of Burundi